Artem Vitaliyovych Tyeryekhov (born 31 March 1992) is a Ukrainian professional footballer who plays as a centre-back for Obolon Kyiv.

References

External links
 Profile on Polissya Zhytomyr official website
 
 

1992 births
Living people
Ukrainian footballers
Association football defenders
FC Mariupol players
FC Bukovyna Chernivtsi players
FC Hirnyk Kryvyi Rih players
FC Obolon-Brovar Kyiv players
FC Kolos Kovalivka players
FC Obolon-2 Kyiv players
FC Polissya Zhytomyr players
Ukrainian First League players
Ukrainian Second League players